Britannia of Billingsgate is a 1933 British musical comedy film directed by Sinclair Hill and starring Violet Loraine, Gordon Harker, Kay Hammond and John Mills. A family who work in the fish trade at Billingsgate Market encounter a film crew who are shooting there. It was based on the play Britannia of Billingsgate by Christine Jope-Slade and Sewell Stokes.

It was shot at the Lime Grove Studios in London. The film's sets were designed by the art director Alfred Junge.

Cast
 Violet Loraine as Bessie Bolton
 Gordon Harker as Bert Bolton
 Kay Hammond as Pearl Bolton
 John Mills as Fred Bolton
 Drusilla Wills as Mrs Wrigley
 Walter Sondes as Harold Hogarth
 Glennis Lorimer as Maud
 Anthony Holles as Guidobaldi
 Joyce Kirby as Joan
 Gibb McLaughlin as Westerbrook
 Grethe Hansen as Gwen
 Wally Patch as Harry
 Ernest Sefton as Publicity man

Speedway scenes
The motorcycle speedway scenes from the film were shot at Hackney Wick Stadium and featured some of the leading riders in Britain at the time; Colin Watson, Arthur Warwick, Gus Kuhn, Tom Farndon, Claude Rye and Ron Johnson.

References

Bibliography
 Goble, Alan. The Complete Index to Literary Sources in Film. Walter de Gruyter, 1999.

External links

1933 films
1933 musical comedy films
British black-and-white films
British musical comedy films
Films set in London
Films directed by Sinclair Hill
Gainsborough Pictures films
Films scored by Jack Beaver
Films about filmmaking
Films shot at Lime Grove Studios
British films based on plays
1930s English-language films
Motorcycle racing films
1930s British films